Bakal is a Tuareg settlement (formed around a like-named waterhole) in the Gao district of Mali.

References
A report, published by the Centers for Disease Control, about a World Health Organization visit to the village

Populated places in Gao Region
Tuareg